David Rees Snell (born August 20, 1966) is an American actor known for his roles as Detective Ronnie Gardocki on the crime drama The Shield, Detective John Burrows in S.W.A.T. (2018–present), and Paul in The Beacon (2009).

Career
Snell attended the University of Kansas as a theatre major. He performed mostly on stage before becoming involved in television work.

Television
When The Shield was picked up by FX, Snell was initially hired as a non-speaking role. He was told the writers had no plans for developing his character, due to his being a last minute addition to an already large cast of actors. However, after several episodes, his character was made a permanent member of the tactical unit known as The Strike Team. Snell subsequently appeared in almost every episode, with his character garnering a sizable following amongst fans of the show. When his screen time expanded during season 5, he became a full-time cast member for the remainder of the series.

Snell co-starred in the Hallmark TV movie Desolation Canyon (2006) with his fellow Shield cast member Kenny Johnson. More recently, he was cast in a recurring role as a terrorist during the fourth and final season of The Unit. In recent years, he guest starred on Hawthorne, Numb3rs, Lie to Me, Sons of Anarchy, Last Resort, Criminal Minds, Leverage, and Silicon Valley.

Voiceover
Snell is also a voice actor who has appeared in such short films as P1 and Draw the Pirate. He also had speaking roles in a number of video games including Need for Speed: Undercover and Call of Duty 2 Big Red One.

Personal life
David Rees Snell is married to actor Melanie Myers, who played a minor recurring role on The Shield as Officer Paula.
Together, they have 4 children.

Filmography

References

External links

1966 births
Living people
American male film actors
American male television actors